The 11th Mississippi Cavalry Regiment (also known as "Perrin's regiment") was a cavalry formation in the Western Theater of the American Civil War commanded by Col. Robert O. Perrin, from 1863 to March 1865, when he resigned, and Lieut. Col. Henry L. Muldrow, until it was disbanded in May 1865.

History 
The regiment was organized and mustered into Confederate service on October 6, 1863, in North and Middle Mississippi from new and existing companies of mounted men as Perrin's battalion of Mississippi Cavalry. It was expanded, reorganized, and redesignated on December 23, 1863, as Perrin's regiment of Mississippi Cavalry. Perrin's regiment was redesignated on March 20, 1865, as the 11th Mississippi Cavalry Regiment. It was disbanded in May 1865.

Regimental order of battle 
Units of Perrin's regiment included:

 Company A
 Company B
 Company C
 Company D
 Company E
 Company F 
 Company G 
 Company H
 Company I (Barksdale Avengers)
 Company K

See also 
 List of Mississippi Civil War Confederate units

Notes

References

Further reading 

 
 
 
 

 
1863 establishments in Mississippi
1865 disestablishments in Mississippi
Cavalry regiments
Military units and formations established in 1863
Military units and formations disestablished in 1865